Noppawan Lertcheewakarn and Nungnadda Wannasuk were the defending champions, but Wannasuk was not selected for the Thai team. Lertcheewakarn partnered Varatchaya Wongteanchai.

Lertcheewakarn and Wongteanchai won the gold medal, defeating Denise Dy and Katharina Lehnert in the final, 6–3, 6–4. Peangtarn Plipuech and Tamarine Tanasugarn, and Jessy Rompies and Aldila Sutjiadi won the bronze medals.

Medalists

Seeds

Draw

References 
 Draw

Women's Doubles
Women's sports competitions in Singapore